Nahuel Tribulo (born 25 June 1997) is an Argentine professional footballer who plays as a defender for Club Atlético General Lamadrid.

Career
Tribulo's career started with Primera B Nacional side Chacarita Juniors. He made his professional career debut in 2015, playing the full match in an away defeat to Estudiantes on 15 November. He signed a new contract with the club in December 2016. On 25 July 2018, Luján of Primera C Metropolitana loaned Tribulo.

Career statistics
.

References

External links

1997 births
Living people
People from Morón Partido
Argentine footballers
Association football defenders
Primera Nacional players
Argentine Primera División players
Chacarita Juniors footballers
Club Luján footballers
General Lamadrid footballers
Sportspeople from Buenos Aires Province